Saygın  and the related Saygun  are Turkish surnames and the version Saygın also a male given name with the literal meaning "reputable", "respectable" and may refer to:

Given name 
 Saygin Yalcin (born 1985), German entrepreneur and academic lecturer of Turkish origin

Surname Saygın 
 Erdal Saygın (1931–2007), Turkish educator
 Işılay Saygın (1947–2019), politician and Turkish architect

Surname Saygun 
 Ahmet Adnan Saygun (1907–1991), Turkish composer
 Hüseyin Saygun (1920–1993), Turkish footballer

See also 
 Saygı

References

Turkish-language surnames
Turkish masculine given names